Ian E. Upchurch is a former football (soccer) player who represented New Zealand at international level.

Upchurch played nine time for New Zealand including four official full internationals. His first two official matches were against Pacific neighbours Fiji, a 2–0 win on 7 September and a 9–0 win on 14 September 1952. These were followed by games against Tahiti, first a 2–2 draw on 21 September. His final appearance was a 5–3 win, Upchurch replacing the injured Jim Stephenson in goal for that game.

References 

Year of birth missing (living people)
Living people
New Zealand association footballers
New Zealand international footballers
Association football defenders